Le Voyage de Sahar is an album by Tunisian oud player Anouar Brahem recorded in 2005 and released on the ECM label.

Reception 
The Allmusic review by Thom Jurek awarded the album 4 stars stating "Brahem has given listeners another of his wondrous offerings, full of deceptively simple compositions that open into a secret world, one where beauty is so present that it is nearly unapproachable, and it is up to the listener to fill in the spaces offered them by this remarkable trio".

Track listing
All compositions by Anouar Brahem
 "Sur le Fleuve" - 6:33 
 "Le Voyage de Sahar" - 6:55 
 "L 'Aube" - 5:48 
 "Vague/E la Nave Va" - 6:19 
 "Les Jardins de Ziryab" - 4:34 
 "Nuba" - 3:12 
 "La Chambre" - 5:01 
 "Córdoba" - 5:30 
 "Halfaouine" - 2:06 
 "La Chambre Var." - 3:47 
 "Zarabanda" - 4:26 
 "Été Andalous" - 7:05 
 "Vague Var." - 2:18 
Recorded at Auditorio Radio Svizzera in Lugano, Switzerland in February 2005

Personnel
Anouar Brahem - oud
François Couturier - piano
Jean-Louis Matinier - accordion

References

2006 albums
ECM Records albums
Anouar Brahem albums
Albums produced by Manfred Eicher